David de Duarte Macedo (born 24 January 1995), is a Brazilian footballer who plays as a central defender for Bahia, on loan from Fluminense.

Professional career
Duarte made his professional debut with Goiás in a 3-0 Campeonato Brasileiro Série A loss to Paranaense on 30 August 2015.

Career statistics

Honours
Goiás
Campeonato Goiano: 2015, 2016, 2017, 2018

Fluminense
Taça Guanabara: 2022
Campeonato Carioca: 2022

References

1995 births
Living people
People from Rio Grande (Rio Grande do Sul)
Brazilian footballers
Association football defenders
Goiás Esporte Clube players
Fluminense FC players
Esporte Clube Bahia players
Campeonato Brasileiro Série A players
Campeonato Brasileiro Série B players
Sportspeople from Rio Grande do Sul